James Kithan (born 26 December 1994) is an Indian professional footballer who plays as a goalkeeper for I-League club Gokulam Kerala.

Career

Earlier career
Born in Dimapur, Nagaland, Kithan began his career in his native state with Kohima Komets. He soon moved to Kolkata to play for Peerless and then Mohammedan in the Calcutta Football League. In 2017, he once again moved south, this time to join Viva Chennai.

Churchill Brothers
Kithan joined Churchill Brothers prior to the 2017–18 I-League season. He made his professional debut for the club on 2 December 2017 against Shillong Lajong. He couldn't help Churchill Brothers keep a clean sheet though as they fell 2–0. In playing the match, Kithan became only the second player in I-League history to come from Nagaland.

Gokulam Kerala
Kithan joined Gokulam Kerala in 2021.at first he played Kerala Premier League with their reserve team. After showing the quality of his goalkeeping, Kithan was selected to the main team of Gokulam Kerala who was going to play the I-League.

Career statistics

Club

Honours
'''Gokulam Kerala
 I-League: 2021–22

References

1994 births
Living people
People from Wokha district
Indian footballers
Mohammedan SC (Kolkata) players
Churchill Brothers FC Goa players
Association football goalkeepers
Footballers from Nagaland
I-League players
Indian Super League players
NorthEast United FC players
Peerless SC players
Gokulam Kerala FC players